Powe may refer to:
Powe House
Powe, Missouri
B. W. Powe, Canadian poet
Darroll Powe, Canadian ice hockey player 
Jerrell Powe, American NFL player
Karl Powe, American NFL player
Leon Powe, American basketballer
Lucas A. Powe, Jr., American lawyer
Sheldon Powe-Hobbs, Australian rules footballer